The British Rail Class 379 Electrostar is an electric multiple-unit (EMU) passenger train designed and built by the rolling-stock manufacturer Bombardier Transportation. The trains are part of the company's extensive Electrostar family.

The Class 379 was specifically procured in response to a government white paper issued in 2007, under which £185 million of investment was issued to the West Anglia Main Line (WAML), the bulk of which was spent with Bombardier Transportation to procure the 30-strong Class 379 fleet of EMUs. While the type was largely intended to increase capacity, its introduction did enable the withdrawal of ageing units such as the Class 317 EMUs; the programme also involved various infrastructure improvements. The Class 379's introduction was relatively smooth and brought about a noticeable step up in service quality.

The fleet was initially operated by National Express East Anglia (NXEA) and subsequently by Greater Anglia.

Background
Around the start of the twenty-first century, the West Anglia Main Line (WAML) was relatively neglected in terms of investment and attention amongst railway planners in comparison to routes such as the Great Eastern Main Line (GEML) and the lines serving Tilbury and Southend. However, measures to improve the line were unveiled in a government white paper released during 2007; specifically, operator National Express was to receive £185 million of investment in exchange for the introduction of various changes on the WAML, including improved facilities and new timetables; while cascaded trains for other lines would be brought in to bolster service levels in the short term, there was also a long-term ambition to procure a newly built fleet of trains to service the line.

Accordingly, an order valued at £155 million was placed with rolling stock manufacturer Bombardier Transportation for 30 EMUs, these were subsequently designated as the Class 379. The new fleet was procured with the intent to supplement, rather than replace, the majority of the line's existing rolling stock, and thus represented a significant increase in capacity on the WAML. The Class 379 had been ordered as a part of the wider NXEA Service Improvement Plan, which was enacted to expand capacity on the heavily crowded lines into London Liverpool Street. Originally, the fleet was to be owned by Macquarie European Rail, however, as a consequence of Akiem's acquisition of Macquarie's assets, the Class 379 came into Akiem's ownership immediately upon their induction. A key service that the type was procured for was the Stansted Express, from which National Express was reportedly deriving roughly 20 percent of its revenue from operating.

All members of the class were manufactured at Bombardier Transportation Derby Litchurch Lane Works; the first unit was formally unveiled on 13 October 2010. Testing of this initial unit commenced shortly thereafter, after which it was returned to Derby to receive its final fittings. Deliveries of the fleet were at a consistent pace through to the final Class 379 being handed over during August 2011.

Formation 
The thirty Class 379 series consists of four car multiple units, semi permanently formed as DMSO-MSO-PTSO-DMCO.

Units are numbered 379001 to 379030, with individual vehicles being numbered in the following ranges:

DMSO: 61201–61230
MSO: 61701–61730
PTSO: 71901–71930
DMCO: 62101–62130

Design and features

The Class 379 electric multiple-unit train is a member of Bombardier Transportation's Electrostar family, although a number of its features are derived from the Aventra family instead. Unlike the Class 317 units that the Class 379 replaced, it is equipped with regenerative braking to reduce energy consumption. To increase serviceability and support the maintenance process, the Class 379 has been fitted with Bombardier's Orbita predictive fault monitoring system. Other tweaks to improve service rates include CCTV cameras on the roof to monitor the condition of the pantograph. The type has been described as possessing relatively favourable ride quality, remaining smooth despite its high rate of acceleration.

The Class 379 features a 2+2 seating arrangement for standard class, while 2+1 seating is installed in first class, providing 189 standard-class seats and 20 first-class seats across a typical consist. The standard-class seats are mostly airline-style, with a few table seats. Each airline seat features a flip-down table, a coat hook, and a single electrical socket. There are two toilets per four-coach unit, one of them enlarged to accommodate baby-changing facilities and use by the disabled. To assist airport-bound passengers, relatively large luggage racks are installed at several locations, in addition to the smaller overhead luggage racks. A considerable number of bins are provided, to reduce littering and aid the cleanup process.

Among the various passenger amenities, all carriages are fitted with Wi-Fi, the apparatus for which was supplied by the Swedish company Icomera. This connectivity is used for multiple purposes beyond personal internet by passengers: various onboard systems, including the reservation, CCTV, passenger information displays, and miscellaneous sensors and monitoring systems, are interconnected via the Wi-Fi. Condition-related data is seamlessly fed back to the operator's control centre, aiding operations and maintenance. A digital announcement system is provided, which sounds only during the departure of, or upon the approach to, a served station. The interior lighting was supplied by Teknoware, including emergency lighting that fulfils GM/RT 2130 requirements. Air conditioning is also fitted.

Operations

During early 2011, the Class 379 began its phased introduction into revenue service. Over the following three months, a further 18 sets joined the initial pair working the Stansted Express services. They have been worked in a mixture of 12-car and 8-car lengths. The type's introduction was relatively trouble-free, with only minor issues such as moving the onboard catering trollies without damaging the interior being quickly resolved.

During summer 2011, the remaining ten Class 379s began entering service on the Cambridge route. By mid-August 2011, all the units had entered service; this was achieved two months ahead of schedule and enabled the airport services to be entirely worked by eight-car Class 379s, while the older Class 317s were cascaded to other routes. They work on long-distance express services.

The fleet was maintained by Bombardier at Ilford EMU Depot.

Following the end of National Express East Anglia's franchise, the Class 379s were operated by Greater Anglia. In September 2016 it was announced that Greater Anglia was procuring a new fleet of Stadler FLIRT EMUs, designated Class 745/1 and to be operated as fixed-formation 12-car trains. These were intended to replace all of the operator's Class 379s by the end of 2019. But the new fleet's introduction was delayed: the first Class 745/1 entered service on 28 July 2020.

Due to high leasing costs Greater Anglia withdrew the entire fleet from service in February 2022, after which the units were placed in storage.

Battery-Electric Multiple Unit trial
During 2013, the national infrastructure owning company Network Rail announced that unit 379013 would be used as a testbed for a future Battery-Electric Multiple Unit. Following several months of conversion work and non-service testing, the unit was used to carry passengers for the first time on a Manningtree–Harwich Town service on 12 January 2015. Throughout its five-week trial period, data was gathered to assess its performance; it could reportedly operate for up to an hour on battery power alone, while charging via the pantograph took two hours.

Fleet details

Naming
Named units were as follows:
379005 Stansted Express (Nameplate removed)
379011 Ely Cathedral (Nameplate removed)
379012 The West Anglian (Nameplate removed)
379015 City of Cambridge (Nameplate removed)
379025 Go Discover (Nameplate removed)

References

External links

379
Bombardier Transportation multiple units
Battery electric vehicles
25 kV AC multiple units
Train-related introductions in 2011